Damian Lundy (1944–1997) was a religious brother of the de La Salle Order. He was born as Michael Lundy in Sowerby Bridge in Yorkshire on 21 March 1944. Some sources state he died in 1996, but others that it was in 1997 at the age of 53. 
He entered the De la Salle Brothers order in 1960. He is widely respected as a leading innovator in many forms of Catholic ministry and education in the UK. He is credited with devising the currently standard form of Catholic Residential Youth Work and for writing many popular hymns and prayers and leading seminars and conferences.

In 1975, Damian founded St Cassian's Centre, Kintbury, which is still operating today as a widely visited and respected Catholic Youth Retreat Centre.

He is remembered for his popular hymn: Walk in the light. Publications include:
 What's the Point of It All? (Scripture for Living), 1992
 Songs of the Spirit, 1978
 Hymns Old and New – with Kevin Mayhew, 1980

References

1943 births
English Roman Catholics
De La Salle Brothers
Christian hymnwriters
English hymnwriters
1996 deaths